University College of Engineering may refer to:

 University College of Engineering, Arni, Tamil Nadu, India
 University College of Engineering, Kakatiya University, Telangana, India
 University College of Engineering, Kanchipuram, Tamil Nadu, India
 University College of Engineering, Kariavattom, Kerala, India
 University College of Engineering, Nagercoil, Tamil Nadu, India
 University College of Engineering, Osmania University, Telangana, India
 University College of Engineering, Pattukkottai, Tamil Nadu, India
 University College of Engineering, Thodupuzha, Kerala, India